Benetton may refer to:

 Benetton Group, an Italian clothing retailer
 Benetton family, the family who were responsible for the brand's creation 
 Benetton Formula, a Formula One constructor which became Renault F1 in 2002
 Benetton Rugby, an Italian rugby union club
 Pallacanestro Treviso, a basketball club often referred to as Benetton Basket.